USS Mohican has been the name of more than one United States Navy ship, and may refer to:

 , a sloop-of-war, launched in 1859, commissioned that same year and decommissioned in 1872.
 , also a sloop-of-war, launched in 1883, commissioned in 1885 and decommissioned in 1921.
 , a converted yacht, commissioned in 1917 and decommissioned in 1919.

References

United States Navy ship names